Salatiel Livenja Bessong (born December 26, 1987), better known as  Salatiel  or "High man general", is a Cameroonian Music executive, the CEO of Alpha Better records located in Buea, Cameroon. In 2019, he featured on Beyoncé’s The Lion King: The Gift Album on the track "Water".

Career 
His career started in 2014, the year Alpha Better records was founded; producing about 60 percent of Cameroon Hit songs between 2014 and present with hit songs from artists like Mr. Leo, Daphne, Askia and Blaise B. He emerged the best producer of the Urban Jamz Awards 2018 edition, and had six nominations for Best Music video performance, Best music producer, Best Afrobeat/pop song, Best Collabo, Best Male Artist and Artist of The Year Urban Jamz Awards 2019 edition. His single "Fab Kolo" won the MTN Cameroon Make the contest competition. In July 2019, he announced the release of his first international album titled Africa represented will be launched on most streaming platforms, he has been nominated at the AFRIMMA awards 2019.

Awards and nominations 

Won "Best Male Artist of the Year" on Urban Jamz Awards. (AFRIMA 2018)
Won "the MTN Cameroon Make the contest competition.
Nominated for "Best Music video performance, Best music producer, Best Afrobeat/pop song, Best Collabo, Best Male Artist and Artist of The Year" for Cameroon 2019.

Discography

Albums 
 2021: Africa represented

Singles 

 2014: Fap Kolo
 2016: Ça Se Passe Ici
 2016: One Day Na One Day
 2016: Bougez La Bas! ft Maahlox Le Vibeur & Myra
 2016: We Are Champions ft Mr Leo ft Mink's, Daphne, Valdez et Mary A
 2017: Toi et Moi
 2017: La Femme De Ma Galère
 2018: Comme Ça ft. Daphne
 2018: Weekend
 2018 : Sans Complexe feat Magasco
 2019: Anita
 2020: Ayagayo (Good Times)
 2022: Pelé feat Petit Pays

Collaborations

 2016: Clando by Blaise B
 2016: Sponsor by Mink's
 2017: Higher Higher by Mr. Leo avec Askia et Blaise B
 2017: Qu'Est Ce Qui N'a Pas Marché? feat Mr. Leo, Askia et Blaise B
 2018: Rembourser by Meshi
 2018: C'est la vie by Mr Leo
 2019: Seul Au Monde Remix de byGérard Ben
 2019: Che Woue by Stephane Akam
 2019:  Water feat Beyonce & Pharrell Williams
 2020: Sans toi  bySandy
 2021: Iyori  by Rinyu
 2022: Junglage by Dinga

References

External links

Living people
1987 births
21st-century Cameroonian male singers